Chaetocnema concinna, known generally as the brassy flea beetle, is a species of flea beetle in the family Chrysomelidae. Other common names include hop flea beetle, beet flea beetle, and brassy-toothed flea beetle. It is found in Europe and Northern Asia (excluding China) and North America.

References

Further reading

 
 
 
 
 

Alticini
Beetles described in 1802
Taxa named by Thomas Marsham